Cheerleading is a recognized sport in Japan that requires physical strength and athletic ability. Cheerleading is available at the junior high school, high school, collegiate, club, and all-star level. Teams can either be all female or coed featuring males and females.

In Japan the situation is complex with at least 3 cheerleading organizations.

 Japan Federation for Sport Cheer & Dance (Cheer Japan, 2010). Cheer Japan has recognition from the International Olympic Committee (IOC) and SportAccord through the official governing body of cheer the International Cheer Union (ICU)
 United Spirit Association Japan (USA Japan, 1988)
 Universal Cheerleaders Association (UCA Japan, 1987), renamed to Japan Cheerleading Association (JCA) in 1994 and renamed later Foundation of Japan Cheerleading Association (FJCA) is recognized by the JOC and IFC (As of 2019 the IFC no longer has IOC, Sportaccord recognition through the WDSF)

Competition guidelines 
 FJCA Competition

Competition routines are held on a 12-meter square mat in which the entire surface can be used. Each team must perform a 2 minute 30 second routine in which 1 minute and 30 seconds of the routine may contain music. Routines showcase different elements including sideline cheers, pyramids and stunts, dance, and gymnastics. There is also a division for group stunt competition where a group of five participants perform a 60–65 seconds routine of strictly stunts. There is also a division for partner stunt competition that includes one male and one female and one spotter. These routines last around 55–60 seconds and can only incorporate stunting.

History

Cheer Japan: History 

 February 2010: Foundation of the Japan Federation for Sport Cheer & Dance (Cheer Japan)
 May 9, 2011: ICU Cheerleading World Championship 2011
 May 11, 2012: ICU Cheerleading World Championship 2012
 May 10, 2013: ICU Cheerleading World Championship 2013
 May 9, 2014: ICU Cheerleading World Championship 2014
 May 18, 2015: ICU Cheerleading World Championship 2015
 May 16, 2016: ICU Cheerleading World Championship 2016
 May 10, 2017: ICU Cheerleading World Championship 2017
 May 10, 2017: ICU Junior World Cheerleading Championships 2017
 May 9, 2018: ICU Cheerleading World Championship 2018
 May 9, 2018:ICU Junior World Cheerleading Championships 2018
 May 9, 2019: ICU Cheerleading World Championship 2019
 May 9, 2019: ICU Junior World Cheerleading Championships 2019

UCA Japan-JCA-FJCA: History 
 June 15, 1987: Universal Cheerleaders Association Japan  (ＵＣＡ国際チアリーダーズ協会 / UCA "International Cheerleaders Association")  is founded
 April 24, 1988: Cheerleading Nation Championship in Japan (1st Japan Championships)
 July 13, 1988: UCA Japan opens its association office in Akasaka, Minato-ku, Tokyo
 December 23, 1989: 1st All Japan Student Championships
 May 5, 1990: 1st International Cheerleading All-Japan Championships
 August 18, 1990: Japan Championships begin airing by NHK satellite broadcasting
 January 27, 1991: 1st All Japan High School Championships
 December 15, 1991: 1st instructor qualification test conducted
 January 10, 1994: Universal Cheerleaders Association renamed to Japan Cheerleading Association
 August 22, 1998: International Cheerleading Federation inauguration 
 November 18, 2001: 1st World Championships, women's Japanese team won the men and women mixed sector
 February 23, 2003: 1st All Japan club team Championships
 November 15, 2003: 2nd Cheerleading World Championships, women Japanese team wins the men and women mixed sector
 November 5, 2005: 3rd World Championship victory for the women's Japanese team
 April 21, 2007: 1st Asia International Open Championship
 November 17, 2007: 4th World Championships, women's and men and women mixed Japanese teams won
 November 28, 2009: 5th World Championships, men and women mixed Japanese teams won
 November 26, 2011: 6th World Championships, men and women mixed Japanese teams won
 November 23, 2013: 7th World Championships, women's, men and women mixed, and group stunt teams participate
 April 1, 2014: Specialized cheerleading unit established in Tokyo High School Athletic Federation

Associations and organizations

See also 
 Ōendan

References

Japan
Sport in Japan